Stade rue Henri Dunant is a football stadium in Beggen, a quarter of Luxembourg City, in northern Luxembourg.  It is currently the home stadium of FC Avenir Beggen.  The stadium has a capacity of 4,830.

References
World Stadiums - Luxembourg

Rue Henri Dunant
Rue Henri Dunant